Regent is a city in Hettinger County, North Dakota, United States. The population was 170 at the 2020 census.

History
Regent was founded in 1910 when the railroad was extended to that point. The city was so named with the aim of promoting its central location in order to attract the county seat. A post office has been in operation at Regent since 1910.

Geography
Regent is located at  (46.421937, -102.557208).

Demographics

2010 census
As of the census of 2010, there were 160 people, 80 households, and 47 families residing in the city. The racial makeup of the city was 97.5% White, 1.9% Native American, and 0.6% from two or more races.

There were 80 households, of which 16.3% had children under the age of 18 living with them, 50.0% were married couples living together, 7.5% had a female householder with no husband present, 1.3% had a male householder with no wife present, and 41.3% were non-families. 41.3% of all households were made up of individuals, and 21.3% had someone living alone who was 65 years of age or older. The average household size was 2.00 and the average family size was 2.70.

The median age in the city was 52 years. 16.9% of residents were under the age of 18; 4.4% were between the ages of 18 and 24; 16.3% were from 25 to 44; 33.2% were from 45 to 64; and 29.4% were 65 years of age or older. The gender makeup of the city was 51.9% male and 48.1% female.

2000 census
As of the census of 2000, there were 211 people, 99 households, and 62 families residing in the city. The population density was 385.8 people per square mile (148.1/km). There were 126 housing units at an average density of 230.4 per square mile (88.5/km). The racial makeup of the city was 98.58% White and 1.42% Native American. Hispanic or Latino of any race were 0.47% of the population.

There were 99 households, out of which 21.2% had children under the age of 18 living with them, 53.5% were married couples living together, 8.1% had a female householder with no husband present, and 36.4% were non-families. 36.4% of all households were made up of individuals, and 26.3% had someone living alone who was 65 years of age or older. The average household size was 2.13 and the average family size was 2.75.

In the city, the population was spread out, with 23.2% under the age of 18, 1.9% from 18 to 24, 19.9% from 25 to 44, 20.4% from 45 to 64, and 34.6% who were 65 years of age or older. The median age was 50 years. For every 100 females, there were 91.8 males. For every 100 females age 18 and over, there were 100.0 males.

The median income for a household in the city was $24,250, and the median income for a family was $29,688. Males had a median income of $25,000 versus $13,333 for females. The per capita income for the city was $11,857. About 17.9% of families and 21.5% of the population were below the poverty line, including 38.9% of those under the age of eighteen and 10.1% of those 65 or over.

Education
It is in the Mott/Regent School District.

Business
Regent gained a moment of national notoriety when The Wall Street Journal published an article about a dispute among its telephone service providers.  Consolidated Telephone Cooperative was the sole provider, but Western Wireless Corp. moved into town, providing service by cellular connection and thus saving the costs of installing wires.  Angered by the loss of its customers, Consolidated refused to connect calls to and from Western's central switch, effectively disconnecting all of Western's customers in town.  Western complained to regulatory authorities, and Consolidated agreed to connect the disconnected customers.  The Journal noted that issues of possible monopoly, alleged illegal anticompetitive practices, and the preservation of established rural carriers (and their subsidies) in the face of competition from new rivals were potentially at stake.

Arts and culture
Regent is home to the "Enchanted Highway", a series of metal sculptures by artist Gary Greff.  Greff and the town of Regent were featured on the "NBC Nightly News" on August 26, 2007. The Hettinger County Historical Society Museum is located in Regent. The Regent area is acclaimed for its pheasant hunting.

Notable person

 Byron Dorgan, state Tax Commissioner (1969-1980), U.S. Congressman (1981-1992), and Senator (1992-2011)

References

External links

 Regent, North Dakota, and the Enchanted Highway, a Photo Gallery
 Home Page of Regent, North Dakota, 58650
 Enchanted Highway, the World's Largest Metal Sculptures

Cities in Hettinger County, North Dakota
Cities in North Dakota
Populated places established in 1910